Palletooru is a 1952 Indian Telugu-language drama film directed by T. Prakash Rao in his directorial debut. It stars N. T. Rama Rao and Savitri, with music composed by Ghantasala. It was produced by P. Sivaramayya under People's Art Productions banner. The film was a big hit and initiated a trend of films with rural settings and social themes.

Plot
Chandram is a dynamic youth of a village who educates the villagers about new scientific techniques to develop their agriculture skills. He falls for a beautiful girl Suguna, daughter of a farmer Sambayya. The village head Ganapati poses himself as a devotee but was actually a malevolent person who tries to cease Chandram's activities along with his associate Sankaram.

Once Ganapathi tries to molest his henchmen Kondayya's wife Santha, the cousin of Chandram but she escapes. Keeping that grudge in mind, he slanders against Santha that she has illicit relations with Chandram when Kondayya necks her out. Meanwhile, Ganapathi exploits Sambayya and he decides to couple up Suguna with him to which she refuses. So, Ganapathi and Sankaram incriminate Chandram and he is sentenced.

Parallelly, Ganapathi also implicates Kondayya in a black-marketing case and sends him to jail. In prison, Chandram makes Kondayya realize his mistake. After release, the bravo Chandram stands courageously for justice, gives a check to the baddies, and makes them punished for their deeds. Finally, the movie ends on a happy note with the marriage of Chandram and Suguna.

Cast
N. T. Rama Rao as Chandram
Savitri as Suguna
S. V. Ranga Rao as Ganapati
Ramana Reddy as Sankaram
Mikkilineni as Lawyer
Perumallu as Pichayya
Chadalavada as Subbayya
Nagabhushanam as Kondayya
Koduuri Achayya as Sambayya
T. G. Kamala Devi  as Santha
Hemalatha as Anasuya
Vasundhara as Naagulu
Seshamamba as Pichamma
Padmavathi as Seetamma
Baby Krishna Veni as Lalitha

Soundtrack
Music was composed by Ghantasala. Lyrics were written by Sunkara and Vasireddy.

References

External links
 

1950s Telugu-language films
1952 films
Indian black-and-white films
Films directed by T. Prakash Rao
Indian drama films
1952 drama films